Bob Morane is a series of adventure books by Henri Vernes about the hero of the same name.

Bob Morane also refers to:

Bob Morane (1965 TV series)
Bob Morane (1998 TV series)
Bob Morane (video game series)
Bob Morane (comics)

See also
Robert and Léon Morane, French aviation pioneers
Bob Moran, British cartoonist